is a Japanese actor and filmmaker. He directs films under his birthname, spelled differently in Kanji but pronounced the same.

Early life and work 
Saito was born on August 22, 1981, in Minato, Tokyo. Saitoh's father worked in the film industry and he would often visit him at work as a child, which he later cited as his inspiration to become an actor.

While still attending high school, Saitoh signed a modeling contract with Indigo at age 15.

Filmography

Films

As director
 Zokki (2020)
 Home Sweet Home (2023)

As actor
 Toki no Kaori: Remember Me (2001) as Yuuji
 Umizaru (2004) as Shinji Tadokoro
 Kabuto-Oh Beetle (2005) as Hametsu Oh Disaster
 Karasu wa naite iruka? (2006)
 The Prince of Tennis (2006) as bystander
 Dance Master (2006) as Momochi Shintaro
 Ulysses (2006) as Sarai
 Zura-Deka – The Rag Cop (2006) detective Yatsuda
 Boys Love (2006) as Noel Kisaragi
 Sukitomo (2007) as Tomokazu Aoi
 A! Osara Ni Kubi Ga Notteiru! (2007) as Odagiri
 Itsuka no Kimi e (2007) as Noboru and Ryuu Fukami
 Clearness (2008) as Ryo
 Akanbo Shojo - Tamami: The Baby's Curse (2008) as Takaya Yoshimura 
 Syun Kin Syou (2008) as Sasuke
 Saburo as Kita no Riki (2009)
 Kujira (2009) as Maruha
 Shinjuku Incident (2009)
 20th Century Boys: Final (2009)
 Hammer Head Man (2009) ( Elite Yankee Saburo spin-off ) as Riki
 RoboGeisha (2009) as Hikaru Kageno
 Vampire Girl vs. Frankenstein Girl (2009) as Jugon Mizushima
 Cafe Seoul (2009) as Jun Isaka 
 Elevator (2009) as Jun Ogawa
 Shibuya (2010)
 13 Assassins (2010) as Makino Uneme
 Space Battleship Yamato (2010) as Yamamoto 
 Saijo no Meii (2010) as Saijo Mikoto
 Ace Attorney (2012) as Reiji Mitsurugi
 For Love's Sake (2012) as Hiroshi Iwashimizu
 High&Low The Red Rain(2016) as Takeru Amamiya
 The Kodai Family (2016) as Mitsumasa Kōdai
 Unrequited Love (2016)
 Danchi (2016)
 Scoop! (2016)
 Shin Godzilla (2016)
 Yo-kai Watch: Soratobu Kujira to Double no Sekai no Daibōken da Nyan! (2016) as Nurarihyon
 Hirugao: The Movie (2017)
 The Blue Hearts (2017)
 Cross (2017)
 Re:Born (2017)
 Last Winter, We Parted (2018)
 Flea-picking Samurai (2018)
 Ramen Teh (2018)
 A Gambler's Odyssey 2020 (2019) as Bouya Tetsu
 The Prisoner of Sakura (2019)
 Diner (2019)
 Manriki (2019)
 Wotakoi (2020) as Tarō Kabakura
 Threads: Our Tapestry of Love (2020) as Daisuke Mizushima
 Fukushima 50 (2020)
 State of Emergency (2020)
 Beautiful Dreamer (2020) as Takumi
 Kiba: The Fangs of Fiction (2021)
 Love Mooning (2021) as Shigeru Uchiyama
 Cube (2021) as Hiroshi Ide
 Last of the Wolves (2021) as Yūma Tachibana
 Shin Ultraman (2022) as Shinji Kaminaga
 Goodbye Cruel World (2022)
 Ichikei's Crow: The Movie (2023) as Shingo Tsukimoto
 The Legend and Butterfly (2023) as Tokugawa Ieyasu
 Downfall (2023) as Kaoru Fukazawa

Television

 Taiho shichauzo (You're Under Arrest) (TV Asahi, 2002) as Mizushima Tomoya
 RPG – Role Playing Game (NHK, 2003) as Tatsuya Ishiguro
 Ai to Shihon Shugi (WOWOW dramaW, 2003) as Takashi
 Be-Bop High School (TBS, 2004) as Ikeda Tsuyoshi
 Katouke he Irasshai (Nagoya TV, 2004) as Nakamura Youichi
 Tokyo michi ka (Fuji TV, 2004)
 Higuchi Ichiyo Monogatari (TBS, 2004) as Baba Kochou
 Umizaru TV (Fuji TV, 2005) as Shinji Tadokoro
 GARO (TV Tokyo, 2005)
 Princess Princess D (TV Asahi, 2006) as Shuuya Arisada
 Delicious Gakuin (2007) as Carlo Sasayama
 Este (2007) as Shikishima Shichiri
 Kaze no Hate (NHK, 2007) as Sugiyama Shikanosuke
 Full Swing  (NHK, 2008) as Hiroshi Wakamatsu
 Shichinin no Onna Bengoshi (TVasahi, 2008) Ep. 5 as Momotarou
 Otokomae!  (NHK, 2008) as Takeda Shinsaburo 
 Oya Koukou Play  (MBS 2008) as Yuuzo
 Mito Komon  (TBS 2009)Season 39 Ep.14 as Yamazaki Shingo
 Gokusen Graduation Special '09 (NTV 2009) as Mamiya
 Otokomae! 2  (NHK, 2009) as Takeda Shinsaburo
 Fumou Chitai (Fuji TV, 2009) as Makoto Iki
 Chase – Kokuzei Sasatsukan (NHK, 2010) as Kiichi Hiyama
 Kurohyo Ryu ga Gotoku Shinsho (MBS, TBS, 2010) as Tatsuya Ukyo
 GeGeGe no Nyōbō (NHK, 2010) as Akira Komine
 Hanazakari no Kimitachi e (Fuji TV, 2011) as Hokuto Umeda
 Kurohyo Ryu ga Gotoku Shinsho (Season 2) (MBS, TBS, 2012) as Tatsuya Ukyo
 Hirugao: Heijitsu Gogo 3 ji no Koibito tachi (Fuji TV, 2014) as Yuichiro Kitano
 Akira and Akira (WOWOW, 2017) as Akira Yamazaki
 BG Personal Bodyguard (TV Asahi, 2018) as Masaya Takanashi
 Hanbun, Aoi (NHK, 2018) as Shōhei Motosumiyoshi
 Shiroi Kyotō (TV Asahi, 2019) as Tōru Sekiguchi
 Idaten (NHK, 2019) as Katsuo Takaishi
 He's Expecting (Netflix, 2022) as Kentaro Hiyama

Theatre

  乱: Run (2009)
 Musical Tennis no Oujisama  The Imperial Presence Hyotei Gakuen feat. Higa Ver. Tokyo gaisenkouen (2008) as Yuushi Oshitari 
 Musical Tennis no Oujisama  Dream Live 5th (2008) as Yuushi Oshitari 
 The Family 絆 (2007) 
 Soratobu John to Manjiro (2007) as Toranosike Momoi
 Men & Man (2006) as Tsutomo
 Musical Tennis no Oujisama Advancement Match Rokkaku Chuu feat. Hyotei Gakuen (2006) as Yuushi Oshitari 
 Musical Tennis no Oujisama Dream Live 3rd (2006) as Yuushi Oshitari
 Musical Tennis no Oujisama The Imperial Match Hyotei Gakuen in winter 2005-2006 (2005) as Yuushi Oshitari
 Musical Tennis no Oujisama The Imperial Match Hyotei Gakuen (2005) as Yuushi Oshitari
 Jump Festa Bleach (2004) as Ichigo Kurosaki

Dubbing
 Assassin's Creed as Callum "Cal" Lynch / Aguilar de Nerha (Michael Fassbender)
 Journey to the West: Conquering the Demons as Tang Sanzang (Wen Zhang)
 Paddington 2 as Phoenix Buchanan (Hugh Grant)

Discography

 Musical Tennis no Ōjisama Best Actor Series 004

 "Saigo no Christmas" [limited edition CD single]

 Kokoro no Gururi [album]

Radio shows
 Takumizm (2009)
 Takumizm (2008)
 Takumizm (2007)
 Bug A Map (Bay 78fm, 2006)

DVD specials
 "CALLING" Idol DVD (2006)
 Search for my roots in China (2007)
 Search for my roots in Thailand (2008)

Awards

References

External links
  
 Takumi Saito at Blue Bear House 

1981 births
Living people
Japanese male film actors
Japanese male models
Japanese male musical theatre actors
Japanese male television actors
Male actors from Tokyo
Singers from Tokyo
21st-century Japanese male actors
21st-century Japanese singers
21st-century Japanese male singers